Ahmed H. Moharran is an Egyptian diver. He competed in two events at the 1960 Summer Olympics.

References

External links
 
 

Year of birth missing (living people)
Living people
Egyptian male divers
Olympic divers of Egypt
Divers at the 1960 Summer Olympics
Place of birth missing (living people)